Estrone glucuronide, or estrone-3-D-glucuronide, is a conjugated metabolite of estrone. It is formed from estrone in the liver by UDP-glucuronyltransferase via attachment of glucuronic acid and is eventually excreted in the urine by the kidneys. It has much higher water solubility than does estrone. Glucuronides are the most abundant estrogen conjugates and estrone glucuronide is the dominant metabolite of estradiol.

When exogenous estradiol is administered orally, it is subject to extensive first-pass metabolism (95%) in the intestines and liver. A single administered dose of estradiol is absorbed 15% as estrone, 25% as estrone sulfate, 25% as estradiol glucuronide, and 25% as estrone glucuronide. Formation of estrogen glucuronide conjugates is particularly important with oral estradiol as the percentage of estrogen glucuronide conjugates in circulation is much higher with oral ingestion than with parenteral estradiol. Estrone glucuronide can be reconverted back into estradiol, and a large circulating pool of estrogen glucuronide and sulfate conjugates serves as a long-lasting reservoir of estradiol that effectively extends its terminal half-life of oral estradiol. In demonstration of the importance of first-pass metabolism and the estrogen conjugate reservoir in the pharmacokinetics of estradiol, the terminal half-life of oral estradiol is 13 to 20 hours whereas with intravenous injection its terminal half-life is only about 1 to 2 hours.

See also
 Catechol estrogen
 Estradiol sulfate
 Estriol glucuronide
 Estriol sulfate
 Estrogen conjugate
 Lipoidal estrogen

References

External links 
 Metabocard of Estrone Glucuronide – Human Metabolome Database

Estranes
Estrogens
Estrone esters
Glucuronide esters
Human metabolites